Tartyshevo is a rural locality (a village) in Nebylovskoye Rural Settlement, Yuryev-Polsky District, Vladimir Oblast, Russia. The population was 3 as of 2010.

Geography 
Tartyshevo is located 32 km southeast from Yuryev-Polsky (the district's administrative centre) by road. Mukino is the nearest rural locality.

References 

Rural localities in Yuryev-Polsky District